Nine Media Corporation (formerly known as Solar Television Network, Inc. or STVNI) is a Filipino-based media company. Formerly a wholly owned subsidiary of Solar Entertainment Corporation (SEC), a multimedia television and film company of the Tieng family, it is now solely owned by the ALC Group of Companies of the late Amb. Antonio Cabangon Chua. Nine Media is currently an affiliate of Aliw Broadcasting Corporation. Its headquarters are located at the Ground Floor of the Worldwide Corporate Center, Epifanio de los Santos Avenue corner Shaw Boulevard, Mandaluyong, sharing with its former parent Solar Entertainment.

It owns and operates its sole television property CNN Philippines, as well as the 34% controlling share of Radio Philippines Network (RPN). The company is named after its flagship television station in Metro Manila.

History

TV channel
Solar Entertainment launched Solar TV in the early 2000s, which was later renamed to Solar USA and then to USA. USA was split into two channels, Jack TV and Crime/Suspense, in 2005.

Solar TV launched last November 29, 2009, on Radio Philippines Network (RPN), then owned by the Philippine Government Communications Group, at 11:00am (Solar Entertainment already has an airtime lease agreement with RPN in 2007). Its programming grid primarily includes American programs, and local sports and lifestyle content. On October 31, 2010, it changed some of its programming content to English/Tagalog.

Broadcast company
Solar TV morphed as Solar Television Network, Inc. (STVNI) on January 5, 2010, as the corporate television arm of Solar Entertainment Corporation, serving as blocktimer of Solar Entertainment's channels to free-to-air broadcasting networks. STVNI later represents Solar Entertainment to acquire 34% of RPN's shares from the Philippine government as part of RPN/IBC privatization in 2011. The new company launched an all talk/news channel Talk TV on March 2, 2011, co-owned by Solar TV itself and SBN while ETC replaced Solar TV on RPN. Talk TV would later change its name to Solar News Channel on October 30, 2012.

In the last quarter of 2011, Solar TV launched its own news division Solar News. The programs produced by the new division were manned by former ANC personalities including Jing Magsaysay, Pia Hontiveros, Nancy Irlanda, Claire Celdran and Mai Rodriguez.

In November 2013, San Miguel Corp. President and COO Ramon S. Ang personally tried to acquire the majority stake of STVNI from the Tiengs. Despite the new development, he would settle instead for a minority share of STVNI in September 2014.
 
In the third quarter of 2014, Solar Entertainment chair Wilson Tieng announced that the ALC Group of Companies of former Ambassador Antonio Cabangon-Chua, took over STVNI, as well as its majority stake on RPN. Tieng and (RPN president) Robert Rivera were both resigned as chairman and president, respectively. The selloff of STVNI was also caused by Solar Entertainment's loss of revenue after investing in RPN. Solar TV reflected the change of ownership by reverting all non-SNC channels and  assets back to Solar Entertainment, followed by shedding off the Solar branding in all SNC's programs. The transfer was completed when SNC (which was transferred to RPN in December 2013) was finally rebranded into 9TV on August 23, 2014.

On October 14, 2014, Solar TV Network was renamed as Nine Media Corporation, following the agreement between the latter and the Turner Broadcasting System to use the branding of CNN into its free TV assets of RPN as CNN Philippines, replacing 9TV, which was considered as a transitional brand. CNN Philippines was launched on March 16, 2015.

In September 2015, Nine Media Corporation President and CEO Reggie Galura stepped down from his position, and was replaced by Jorge San Agustin as Officer-in-Charge of the network. On October 9, 2016, CNN Philippines Managing Editor Armie Jarin-Bennett was appointed as president and CEO of Nine Media Corporation replacing San Agustin.

Corporate Structure

As Solar TV Network
Solar Entertainment Corp. (SEC) and Solar TV (STV), prior to the latter's acquisition by ALC Group of Companies in 2014, are two separate business entities:
SEC is exclusively owned by the Tieng brothers and operates 10 TV networks - ETC, 2nd Avenue, JackTV, JackCITY, Solar Sports, Basketball TV, NBA Premium, Shop TV, The Game Channel and My Movie Channel. It also has activities in film distribution.
STV, which presently runs Solar News Channel, is an incorporation wherein both William Tieng and Wilson Tieng are members of the board of directors.

As Nine Media
Since 2014, Nine Media Corporation is being owned by ALC Group of Companies through its investment unit JRLT-JHI Corporation. While Antonio Cabangon-Chua was sitting as its chairman until his passing in 2016, JRLT-JHI is being owned by his children and relatives: Ferdinand Chua (20%), Rowena Lumague (20%), Candy Co (20%), Jose Wingkee Jr (20%), and Aida Anora (20%). While businessman Ramon Ang reportedly owns a minority share in Nine Media, SEC documents does not shows any Ang's shares with the company. Instead, Ang makes investments through advertisements and paid programming from the San Miguel Group to sole property CNN Philippines.

Broadcast assets

TV channels 
Radio Philippines Network (RPN) - (34% share)
CNN Philippines - (joint venture with RPN and Warner Bros. Discovery)

Former divisions, and broadcast assets 
2nd Avenue - (affiliate with RJTV 29: January 1, 2008 – June 5, 2018; reverted to Solar Entertainment)
ETC (now SolarFlix) - (affiliate with SBN 21: January 1, 2008 – March 1, 2011; November 30, 2013 – present / RPN 9: March 2, 2011 – November 29, 2013; reverted to Solar Entertainment)
ETC Productions

Previous or changed ownership television channels 
9TV - (RPN 9: August 23, 2014 – March 15, 2015)
CHASE - (BEAM TV 31: December 24, 2011 – October 19, 2012)
C/S - (RPN 9: January 1, 2008 – October 2008)
C/S 9 - (RPN 9: October 4, 2008 – November 28, 2009)
Jack City  - (BEAM TV 31: October 20, 2012 – August 31, 2014 / Cable TV: September 1, 2014 – March 21, 2015; owner of Solar Entertainment)
Solar News Channel - (34% joint venture with RPN 9: December 1, 2013 – August 22, 2014) / (former owned by Southern Broadcasting Network: October 30, 2012 – November 29, 2013)
Solar TV - (RPN 9: November 29, 2009 – February 25, 2011)
Talk TV - (SBN 21: March 2, 2011 – October 29, 2012)

See also
Radio Philippines Network
CNN

References

External links
Media Ownership Monitor Philippines - Media Companies: A Duopoly rules by VERA Files and Reporters Without Borders

Mass media companies of the Philippines
Philippine radio networks
Television networks in the Philippines
Radio Philippines Network
Television in Metro Manila
Television channels and stations established in 2009
Television channels and stations established in 2011
Mass media companies established in 2011
Companies based in Mandaluyong
Philippine companies established in 2011
Privately held companies of the Philippines